The second running of the women's event of the Three Days of Bruges–De Panne, also called Lotto Women Classic  Bruges–De Panne, was held on 28 March 2019. The race started in Bruges and finished in De Panne with two  loops between De Panne and Koksijde, totalling . It was the fourth leg of the 2019 UCI Women's World Tour. Defending champion Jolien D'Hoore did not compete after breaking her collar bone in the Drentse 8.

The race was tightly controlled from the start and no breakaway managed to stay away. With 35km to go, Lizzy Banks crashed and took Elisa Longo Borghini down with her. Longo Borghini, frustrated by the crash, threw Banks' bike on the pavement after untangling the bikes. After the race, she issued a public apology for this. The race finished in a bunch sprint won by Kirsten Wild.

Teams
20 teams competed in the race.

Result

References

Three Days of Bruges–De Panne
Three Days of Bruges–De Panne
Three Days of Bruges–De Panne
Three Days of Bruges–De Panne (women's race)